Ravendusk in My Heart is the debut studio album by Swedish black metal band Diabolical Masquerade. It was released in 1996.

Track listing

Personnel
Blakkheim – vocals, guitar, bass, programming, keyboards, sound effects

Additional personnel
Dan Swanö – additional vocals on "Under the Banner of the Sentinel", drums, mixing, engineering, programming, keyboards, production
Peter in de Betou – mastering (at The Cutting Room)
Mala – album art, photography
Tati S. – photography

References

Diabolical Masquerade albums
1996 debut albums
Profound Lore Records albums
Albums produced by Dan Swanö